This page covers the conifers (class Pinopsida). For the background to this list see parent article List of the vascular plants of Britain and Ireland.

All are part of the order Pinales.

Status key: * indicates an introduced species and e indicates an extinct species.

Species list

Family Pinaceae (pines)

Family Araucariaceae (araucarians)

Family Cupressaceae (cypresses)

Family Taxaceae (yews)

02